Smicridea is a genus of netspinning caddisflies in the family Hydropsychidae. There are more than 210 described species in Smicridea.

See also
 List of Smicridea species

References

Further reading

 
 
 

Trichoptera genera
Articles created by Qbugbot